Rudolph Glacier is a tributary glacier flowing north to enter Trafalgar Glacier in the Victory Mountains, in Victoria Land, Antarctica. It was mapped by the United States Geological Survey from surveys and U.S. Navy air photos, 1960 – 1962, and was named by the Advisory Committee on Antarctic Names for Emanuel D. Rudolph, American botanist, a member of the United States Antarctic Research Program project leader for lichenology studies at Hallett Station in three summer seasons, 1961 - 1964; Director, Ohio State University's Institute of Polar Studies (now Byrd Polar Research Center), 1969 - 1973; Chairman of the Botany Department, Ohio State University, 1978 - 1987.

References

External links 
 Rudolph Glacier on USGS website
 Rudolph Glacier on the Antarctica New Zealand Digital Asset Manager website
 Rudolph Glacier on New Zealand Gazetteer website
  Rudolph Glacier on SCAR website
 Rudolph Glacier on mindat.com

Glaciers of Victoria Land
Borchgrevink Coast